J. William "Willie" Stocks (birth unknown – death unknown) was an English professional rugby league footballer who played in the 1920s and 1930s.

Playing career

International honours
Willie Stocks won a cap for England while at Huddersfield in 1930 against Other Nationalities.

County Honours
Willie Stocks won caps for Yorkshire while at Huddersfield (two caps), and Dewsbury (two caps).

County Cup Final appearances
Willie Stocks played  and scored a goal in Huddersfield's  4-2 victory over Hunslet in the 1931 Yorkshire County Cup Final during the 1931–32 season at Headingley Rugby Stadium, Leeds on Saturday 21 November 1931.

References

Dewsbury Rams players
England national rugby league team players
English rugby league players
Huddersfield Giants players
Place of birth missing
Place of death missing
Rugby league fullbacks
Year of birth missing
Year of death missing
Yorkshire rugby league team players